No. 298 Squadron was a Royal Air Force special operations squadron during the Second World War. Later in that war it changed to the transport role, disbanding after the end of the hostilities.

History

Formation
No. 298 Squadron was formed on 24 August 1942 at RAF Thruxton from a nucleus of 297 Squadron as a special operations squadron, equipped with the Armstrong Whitworth Whitley. The squadron was however not required for operations, so the formation was suspended and the squadron was disbanded on 19 October 1942.

Gliders and Special Operations

The squadron was re-formed on 4 November 1943 at RAF Tarrant Rushton, from 'A' Flight of 295 Squadron, with the Handley Page Halifax. It trained to air-tow the big General Aircraft Hamilcar glider, but began operations in February 1944 in its original role, dropping SOE agents. On 16 March 1944 298 Squadrons 'C' Flight split off, to form 644 squadron.

During the Normandy landing the squadron air-towed both the Airspeed Horsas and the Hamilcars to landing-zones around the beach head. An unusual operation involved parachuting jeeps which had been carried underneath the Halifax. The squadron then returned again to SOE duties. In between the SOE duties the squadron air-towed Hamilcar and Horsa gliders for the Arnhem landing (Operation Market Garden). The squadron moved in March 1945 to RAF Woodbridge, England to air-tow gliders for the Rhine crossing (Operation Varsity). After Operation Varsity the squadron flew normal supply and transport duties.

Transport in British India
In July 1945 the squadron moved to Raipur, British India to provide transport support to the Army. In March 1946 the squadron was involved in rice-dropping sorties from Meiktila, Burma to the starving population in the jungle areas. The squadron disbanded at Mauripur, Sindh, British India (Now Pakistan Air Force Base Masroor) on 21 December or 30 December 1946.

Aircraft operated

Squadron bases

Commanding officers

See also
List of Royal Air Force aircraft squadrons
Personal photographic archive of LAC Arthur Foster (1923-2010) Taken on tour in India https://www.flickr.com/photos/14415433@N02/albums/72157630237914772

References

Notes

Bibliography

External links

 298 squadron page on 38 group website 
 298 squadron history on MOD site
 squadron histories for nos. 296–299 squadron on RAFWeb's Air of Authority – A History of RAF Organisation

298 Squadron
Aircraft squadrons of the Royal Air Force in World War II
Transport aircraft squadrons of the Royal Air Force
Special Operations Executive
Military units and formations established in 1942
Military units and formations disestablished in 1946